Riverside Golf Course is an 18-hole municipal public golf course owned by the city of Portland, Maine, United States. It is located on the banks of the Presumpscot River.

History 
Built in 1932, it was expanded to an 18-hole course in 1937 through funding from the Works Progress Administration.  In 1969, the 9-hole South Course opened featuring a par 35 playing at 2,941 yards. 

From 1938 to 2010, Riverside hosted 42 Maine Open tournaments, the most of any course in the state.

In 2007 the 3-hole practice course was built for the use for junior programming. Throughout the winter the course is used for many winter activities, including cross country skiing, sledding, snowboarding, outdoor ice rink and snowshoeing.

Between 2001 and 2012, the course operated at a loss that cost taxpayers almost $200,000.

In 2016, the group Portland Protectors released a report that showed the course spent $25,000 a year on pesticides as part of its campaign to pass an ordinance restricting pesticide use in the city.  In response, the course reduced synthetic pesticide use by 60% and installed bee hives. When the City Council passed a pesticide ordinance in 2018 requiring organic landscaping, the golf course was exempted from the requirements if it was designed through Audubon International as a Certified Audubon Cooperative Sanctuary. The course continues to use synthetic pesticides. 

The course reopened for the 2020 season with restrictions in place because of the COVID-19 pandemic.

References

Sports venues completed in 1932
Golf clubs and courses in Maine
Parks in Portland, Maine
Sports venues in Portland, Maine
1932 establishments in Maine